Moto G (2021) is a series of Android smartphones that are part of the Moto G family developed by Motorola Mobility, a subsidiary of Lenovo.

Specifications 
Some specifications such as wireless technologies and storage differ between regions.

References 

Android (operating system) devices
Mobile phones introduced in 2021
Mobile phones with multiple rear cameras
Mobile phones with stylus
Motorola smartphones
Mobile phones with 4K video recording